"Simply Wonderful" is the 5th single by Japanese singer Mai Kuraki. It was written by Kuraki herself, Aika Ohno. This single was released on September 27, 2000.

Track listing

Personnel
Mai Kuraki – vocals, backing vocals, lyrics
Aika Ohno – composer, backing vocals
Yoko Black Stone – composer, backing vocals, lyrics
Michael Africk – backing vocals, keyboards
Perry Geyer – computer programming
Miguel Sá Pessoa – keyboards
Mark Kamins – remix
Joey Moskowitz – remix
Tokiko Nishimuro – director
KANONJI – executive producer

Charts and certifications

Weekly Charts

Monthly Charts

Yearly Charts

Certifications

References

External links
Mai Kuraki Official Website

2000 singles
2000 songs
Mai Kuraki songs
Giza Studio singles
Song recordings produced by Daiko Nagato